Jack McCormack may refer to:

Jack McCormack (Australian rules footballer) (1904–1966), Australian rules footballer
Jack McCormack (rugby league) (1904–1996), Australian rugby league player

See also
 John McCormack (disambiguation)